This is a list of wars involving the Republic of North Macedonia (before 2019: Republic of Macedonia).

{| class="wikitable"
|-
!  Conflict
!  width=220px| Combatant 1
!  width=220px| Combatant 2
!  width=595x| Result
|-  valign=top
| Somali Civil War(1992–1995)
| 
|  Somalia
| bgcolor="#DDFFDD"|Victory
 The UN's humanitarian mandate is fulfilled
 About 100,000 lives were saved by outside resistance
 Civil war is ongoing
|-  valign=top
| 2001 insurgency in the Republic of Macedonia(2001)
| 
| National Liberation Army  Albanian National Army
| bgcolor="#EEEEEE"|Ceasefire
 Ohrid Agreement
 Macedonian offensive stopped by NATO involvement
 Ceasefire established
 The majority of Albanian insurgents agree to disarm in exchange for greater ethnic rights
 Low intensity resurgences since November 2001
|-  valign=top
| War in Afghanistan(2001–2014)Part of the War on Terror
|  ISAF

 Northern Alliance
|  Taliban al-Qaeda Mujahideen IMU Haqqani network ETIM Islamic Jihad Union Hezb-e-Islami Gulbuddin United Tajik Opposition

| bgcolor="#EEEEEE"|Withdrawal
 Defeat of the Taliban government in Afghanistan
 Fall of the Islamic Emirate of Afghanistan
 Destruction of al-Qaeda camps
 Osama bin Laden killed
 Establishment of new Afghan government
 Creation of new Afghan army
 Return of more than 5.7 million Afghan refugees from Pakistan and Iran 
|- valign=top 
| Iraq War(2003–2011)Part of the Iraqi insurgency and War on Terror
| 
 USF–I (2009–2011)

 MNF–I (2004–2009)

 Peshmerga
  KDP
  PUK
|  Ba'ath loyalists Islamic State of Iraq al-Qaeda in Iraq Mahdi Army Special Groups IAI Ansar al-Sunnah

  Arab volunteers
 MEK (until 2003 ceasefire) Ansar al-Islam

| bgcolor="#DDFFDD"|Victory
 Invasion and occupation of Iraq
 Defeat of Ba'ath Party regime and execution of Saddam Hussein
 Iraqi insurgency, emergence of al-Qaeda in Iraq, and civil war
 Subsequent depletion of Iraqi insurgency, improvements in public security
 Establishment of democratic elections and formation of new Shia-led government
 Macedonian withdrawal in 2008
 U.S.–Iraq Status of Forces Agreement
 Withdrawal of U.S. forces from Iraq
 War on ISIL
 Iraqi Civil War

References

 
North Macedonia
Wars